George Gershwin Songs, Vol. 1 is a Decca Records studio album (No. A-96) of five 78rpm phonograph records celebrating the music of George Gershwin.

Track listing

Disc 1: (2874)

Disc 2: (2875)

Disc 3: (2876)

Disc 4: (2877)

Disc 5: (2878)

References

1939 compilation albums
Decca Records compilation albums
George Gershwin
Bing Crosby compilation albums